Ramnarayan Yadavendu (1909–1951) was a Hindi writer, storyteller, essayist and social reformer.

Personal life 
Ramnarayan Yadavendu was born into Jatav caste to Dalchand Yadavendu at Agra, Uttar Pradesh. He did his B.A and LLB from Agra university and worked as a contractor. His family was influenced by Arya Samaj and promoted abolition of child marriage, drinking and vegetarianism.

Career 
He was close associate of Manik Chand Jatav-vir and was founding member of Jatav Mahasabha. Both of them were instrumental in bringing Dr. B.R.Ambedkar to Agra for Scheduled Caste Conference. He also helped in establishing the Jatav Veer Institute.

He also served as Pubtlic Officer and Resettlement Officer at Agra in 1945. Later, he became editor of a monthly, 'Vishwamitra' and 'Madhuri'. His book "Yaduvansh Ka Itihas" played an key role in formation of Jatav Mahasabha.

He was a prolific writer of Premchand's era and his writings include - Nabin Bharatiya Shashan Vidhan, Bharatiya Sanskriti aur Nagrik Jivan, Rashtra Sangh aur Vishwa Shanti, Vishvagyan Bharti, Hitler Ke Vichar, Rajya Vigyan aur Shahdhan, Adarsh Patni, Kala, Sahitya Lochan Ke Siddhant, Adarsh Santan Nigrah and Bharat Ka Dalit Samaj. He was also the member of Sudha literary circle called, Sudha Mandal.

References 

1909 births
1951 deaths
Indian writers
20th-century Indian writers